This article lists the squads of all participating teams in the 2022–23 FIH Pro League. The nine national teams involved in the tournament were required to register a squad of up to 32 players.

Argentina
The following is the Argentina squad for the 2022–23 FIH Pro League.

Head coach: Fernando Ferrara

Australia
The following is the Australia squad for the 2022–23 FIH Pro League.

Head coach: Katrina Powell

Belgium
The following is the Belgium squad for the 2022–23 FIH Pro League.

Head coach:  Raoul Ehren

China
The following is the China squad for the 2022–23 FIH Pro League.

Head coach:  Alyson Annan

Germany
The following is the Germany squad for the 2022–23 FIH Pro League.

Head coach: Valentin Altenburg

Great Britain
The following is the Great Britain squad for the 2022–23 FIH Pro League.

Head coach:  David Ralph

Netherlands
The following is the Netherlands squad for the 2022–23 FIH Pro League.

Head coach: Paul van Ass

New Zealand
The following is the New Zealand squad for the 2022–23 FIH Pro League.

Head coach: Darren Smith

United States
The following is the United States squad for the 2022–23 FIH Pro League.

Head coach:  David Passmore

References

Women's FIH Pro League squads